The University of the East Ramon Magsaysay Memorial Medical Center (UERMMMC) College of Medicine is a private medical college within the UERM Memorial Medical Center in the Philippines. Recognized as a Center of Excellence in Research by the Department of Science and Technology and has Level IV Accreditation by PAASCU. It is the first and only private medical school with a Level IV PAASCU Accredited Program. 

The College of Medicine is in the list of top performing medical schools for having an overall passing percentage of 97.8% as of the August 2015 Physician Licensure examination.

History

In 1956, the University of the East College of Medicine, later known as the University of the East Ramon Magsaysay Memorial Medical Center, was established.  As a non-stock, non-profit foundation named in honor of the late President Ramon Magsaysay, UERMMC was the first philanthropic institution in the country.  The mission of the college is stated on their website as "Promote: Sense of pride in and belonging to Alma Mater. Strengthening of the College of Medicine. Professional growth. Advancement of the medical profession. Adherence to Hippocratic oath. Establish more meaningful and greater linkage, greater social interaction and bonding among Alumni and between the medical center and Alumni. Build UERMMMC as the Medical Community of excellence, compassion, harmony and respect."

The Board of Trustees of the University has set its purpose: “complete dedication to the medical education, research and alleviation of human sufferings”.  President Carlos P. Garcia described the founding of UERMMMC as a “great adventure, marking the advent in the Philippines of educational philanthropy”.    

The College of Medicine established its first Community Health Project in Limay, Bataan; introduced the Correlated Lecture Series, the teaching of problem-oriented medical records started the teaching of Family Planning, instituted a clinical clerkship program in the USA; established a grant-in-aid scholarship program; integrated the teaching of primary health care in the curriculum; created a course on the human life cycle; introduced the 'Problem Bases' learning strategy; developed and exported the teaching of research methods to other medical schools. 

The College of Medicine periodically reviews and upgrades its curriculum by instituting general changes such as the implementation of the core curriculum, granting of the M.D. degree after the Fourth year; upgrading of selected subjects; teaching by objectives; role-based curriculum and competencies; and integration of Primary health Care in the curriculum.

Specific changes have also been installed in its search for relevance to the national and local health needs, as well as in keeping with international trends. It put more emphasis on science and art in the teaching of all courses, in order to produce graduates who shall internalize science and art and use them as the bases of medical practice. The curricular structure was made more flexible, allowing the student to participate in directing his learning and providing him adequate time for self-study and greater exposure to non-hospital settings of training. It shifted emphasis of the curricular content to topics, which were directly related to the national and local health and medical problem and issues. A uniform teaching method was utilized for all courses, which fostered the development of problem-solving skills in health and medicine. Through its continued excellence in the field of medical education, the College of Medicine was granted level II accreditation by the PAASCU for a three-year period.

Through its linkages with training hospitals in the United States of America, qualified Filipino-Americans are offered the opportunity to undertake part of their clinical clerkship training in these hospitals. 

Another UERM College of Medicine graduate was included in the Top Ten examinees of the August 2009 Physician Licensure Examination held last August 2009. 

National Passing Average for the August 2009 examination is 71.3%. The College of Medicine is in the list of top performing schools for having an overall passing percentage of 92%. 

The College of Medicine has level IV accreditation, Innovative Curriculum, Recognized as a Center of Excellence in Research by the Department of Science and Technology.

UERM Memorial Hospital
The UERM Memorial Hospital is the medical center for University of the East Ramon Magsaysay in Quezon City, Philippines. It opened in 1957 

The hospital provides psychiatry, neurosurgery, ophthalmology, otorhinolaryngology, ambulatory medicine (OPC), rehabilitation medicine, and emergency medicine. 

Ancillary services are: pathology (clinical, surgical and cytology), radiology, pharmacy, blood bank, cardiopulmonary laboratory, respiratory therapy, GIT-liver study unit, endoscopy unit, neurophysiology laboratory (EEG), audiology and industrial medicine.

Affiliated hospitals

 St. John’s Episcopal Hospital, South Shore, Far Rockaway, New York, USA
 Affiliated Institute of Medical Education, Chicago, Illinois, USA
 Cathay General Hospital, Taipei City, Taiwan, Republic of China
 Buddhist Tzu-Chi General Hospital, Hualien, Taiwan, ROC.

See also
 University of the East

References

 University of the East http://www.ue.edu.ph
 UERMMMC College of Medicine http://www.uerm.edu.ph/?nav=uerm5&link=abt

External links
 University of the East
 UERMMMC

University of the East
Medical schools in the Philippines